Kosmoclymenia is a genus in the ammonoid order Clymeniida, in the family Kosmoclymeniidae.

Species

Description
They were fast-moving nektonic carnivores.

Distribution
Fossils of species within this genus have been found in the Devonian of China, Germany and Morocco.

References

Fossils of Germany
Late Devonian ammonites
Fossils of China
Fossils of Morocco
Famennian life
Famennian genus first appearances
Famennian genus extinctions
Ammonite genera
Clymeniina